Athanasios (Nassos) Kedrakas (November 21, 1915 – August 25, 1981) was a Greek actor.

Biography
Kedrakas studied at the National Theatre School, where he enrolled into law school at the University of Athens in 1942.  During the 1940s, he was active in a climactic company of Enomenon kallitechnon (United Playwrights) in which took part as in actor which he took part even in the resistance.  He played several times at the National Theatre.  Characteristically he was a role in the movie I degyni na fovitai ton andra in which he played as Mike, the drugstore friend Giorgos Konstantinou.  He died on August 25, 1981.

Proses and sketches during the 1940s

Kedrakas took part in art and played in proses and sketches.  In 1940-1949, which he was written by Mimis Traiforos, O Romios (The Romans by Christos Efthymiou and Nassos Kedrakas) (sketch).  San ti Ellada ti leventomana (N. Kedrakas - G. Sylvas - S. Vebo) (prose) and Ade sto kalo (Kleo Skoloudi - N. Kedrakas - Aliki Zaverdinou - Giannis Sylvas) (sketch)

Filmography

As cinematographer

External links
Nassos Kedrakas at 90lepta.com 

1915 births
1981 deaths
People from Trikala
Greek male actors
20th-century Greek male actors